The Josef Odložil Memorial is an annual track and field meeting which takes place in June at Stadion Juliska (until 2001 at Stadion Evžena Rošického) in Prague, Czech Republic.

The competition was first held in 1994 as a race over 2000 m in memory of Czech middle-distance runner Josef Odložil – a silver medallist over 1500 metres at the 1964 Summer Olympics, who died in 1993. The programme expanded to a wider selection of track and field events the following year. The meet grew in stature, attracting a number of top-class international competitors, and by 2004 it had gained IAAF Grand Prix status and was broadcast on television by Eurosport. In 2011, it was selected as an "Outdoor Premium Meeting" by the European Athletics Association.

A memorial race over 1500 m is now held in honour of Odložil and features among the list of events at the meeting.

Meet records

Men

Women

Notes

References

External links

Official website
Josef Odložil Memorial Records

European Athletic Association meetings
Sports competitions in Prague
Athletics competitions in the Czech Republic
Recurring sporting events established in 1994
1994 establishments in the Czech Republic
IAAF Grand Prix
IAAF World Outdoor Meetings